Warm & Wonderful Knitwear is a British fashion brand specialising in knitwear. Founded by Joanna Osborne and Sally Muir in 1979, the label is best known for its "black sheep" sweater, famously worn by Diana, Princess of Wales.

Early years 
In the early days of the company's history, Osborne and Muir sold their jumpers from a market stall in London's Covent Garden. Their earliest designs included a jumper knitted to look like a brick wall, which customers could personalize with knitted "graffiti," and a grass-green jumper covered in knitted rows of white sheep — and one proverbial black sheep.

This latter design, which Osborne and Muir subsequently introduced in other colours (including what is now its most famous colour, red) proved to be a favourite among London's Sloane Ranger set, as well as artists, entertainers, and even royalty: David Bowie, Andy Warhol, Shelley Duvall, Penelope Keith, Anthony Andrews, and Princess Diana.
Osborne and Muir are both professional artists (Osborne a sculptor, and Muir a painter), and both have had work featured in the Royal Academy Summer Exhibition. They have also published a series of knitting books for adults and children. They have stated:As artists, we've always identified with black sheep ourselves: because of a recessive gene, black sheep are born with black wool in flocks of otherwise white sheep (in a flock of a hundred, there might only be one black sheep!). We never imagined that our sheep jumpers would bring so many people so much joy, though we always had fun ourselves.

Princess Diana 
It was Princess Diana — at that time Lady Diana Spencer — who brought the design to international fame when she wore a red Warm & Wonderful sheep jumper for the first time in 1981. Photographs of Diana wearing the sweater were circulated widely in the international media, with many in the press speculating that the sweater was a metaphor, signaling to the world that Diana felt like the "black sheep" of the Royal Family. The Princess wore the Warm & Wonderful sheep jumper again in 1983, eliciting even greater media attention.

2020 - present 
Since 2020, designer Jack Carlson has served as the brand's creative director in partnership with Osborne and Muir, re-launching the original sheep sweater design for the first time in over twenty-five years, first as a collaboration with American label Rowing Blazers and then on its own. Since then, Warm & Wonderful has been featured in Vogue, ELLE, The Telegraph, The Times, Tatler, Harper's Bazaar, People, Financial Times, Town and Country, Vanity Fair, and The New Yorker.

Actress Emma Corrin, portraying Princess Diana, wore a Warm & Wonderful sheep sweater on the Netflix series The Crown.

In 2021 and 2022, Warm & Wonderful launched collaborations with luxury British luggage manufacturer Globe-Trotter and with heritage footwear company Sperry Top-Sider, featuring luggage and handbags, and canvas sneakers, respectively, emblazoned with its famous sheep motif.

Products and distribution 
Aside from its famous sheep sweater in a range of colours, Warm & Wonderful has offered other knitwear designs over the years, ranging from other humorous or country-themed graphic jumpers to solid-colour Shetland, cashmere, and cotton knits. The label has also created accessories and other apparel featuring its sheep motif, including its collaborations with Globe-Trotter and Sperry.

Warm & Wonderful knitwear has been sold at Saks, Henri Bendel, Barneys, Bergdorf Goodman, Neiman Marcus, Liberty, Isetan, Mitsukoshi, and many smaller stores over the years; and since 1982, Osborne and Muir have operated shops in Wandsworth, Primrose Hill, and Brighton — most recently opening a pop-up shop in London's Seven Dials district, very near the original market stall in Covent Garden in 2021.

Victoria & Albert Museum 
The Victoria & Albert Museum, Britain's national archive of textiles and fashion, features a Warm & Wonderful sheep jumper in its permanent collection as part of Britain's national cultural heritage.

References 

British brands
British fashion
Knitwear manufacturers